Sir William Johnston Thomson MIME (1881 – 18 September 1949) was a 20th century Scottish engineer and businessman, highly involved in the early automobile industry, who served two consecutive terms as Lord Provost of Edinburgh from 1932 to 1935. He created the first city to city bus services in Scotland.

Life
He was born in 1881 to a Caithness family.

He served his apprenticeship as an engineer at J & T Boyd, manufacturers of textile making machines at Shettleston Ironworks in Glasgow. Around 1899 he moved to Pollock, Mcnab and Highgate based at Carntyne Station in Shettleston. Around 1900 he joined the newly created automobile manufacturer Arrol-Johnston.

In 1905 he founded the Scottish Motor Traction Company (generally known as the SMT) which became operational at 9 Lauriston Street in south-west Edinburgh in 1906. In 1929 the company took over W. Alexander & Sons, their main rival, together with multiple smaller Scottish bus companies, and thereafter had a virtually monopoly on public transport provision in central Scotland. In conjunction with LMS and LNER the SMT group also largely monopolised rail and road freight.

In 1932 he succeeded Thomas Barnby Whitson as Lord Provost of Edinburgh. Atr the end of his term of office, as was customary, he received a knighthood from the King (at that time George V). However, he then continued for a further term. He was succeeded by Louis Stewart Gumley.

He died on 18 September 1949.

References

1881 births
1949 deaths
20th-century Scottish businesspeople
Lord Provosts of Edinburgh
20th-century Scottish engineers